Holding the Man is a 1995 memoir by Australian writer, actor, and activist Timothy Conigrave. It tells of his 15-year love affair with John Caleo, which started when they met in the mid-1970s at Xavier College, an all-boys Jesuit Catholic school in Melbourne, and follows their relationship through the 90s when they both developed AIDS. The book, which won the 1995 Human Rights Award for Non-Fiction, has been adapted as a play, a docudrama, and in 2015 a film starring Ryan Corr, Craig Stott, Anthony La Paglia, Geoffrey Rush and Guy Pearce.

Caleo was captain of the school football team and the book's title "holding the man" refers to a transgression that incurs a penalty in Australian rules football.

Holding the Man was published in February 1995 by Penguin Books in Australia just a few months after Conigrave's death, and has since been published in Spain and North America. It was described as a "Romeo and Juliet for the AIDS era", a "seminal account of the AIDS pandemic", "soul-shaking" and "one of Australia’s most beloved non-fiction books". It has been reprinted fourteen times and was listed as one of the "100 Favourite Australian Books" by the Australian Society of Authors for its 40th anniversary in 2003. In 2009 Penguin reissued it with an orange and white cover as part of their Popular Penguin series.

In 2015 UK singer Sam Smith praised the memoir on their Instagram account: "The most powerful thing for me was how this book captured what it’s like to grow up gay and all those confusing scary and amazing moments I had coming out and realising who I was…this book and film pretty much changed my life".

Plot
In 1976, Timothy Conigrave, a student at a high school in Victoria, fell in love with the captain of the school football team, John Caleo. So began a relationship that was to last for 15 years, a love affair that weathered disapproval, betrayal, separation, and ultimately death. With honesty and insight, 'Holding the Man' explores the highs and lows of their life partnership: the intimacy, constraints, temptations, and the strength of heart both men had to find when they tested positive for HIV.

The story opens at Kostka, Xavier's junior [preparatory] school in Melbourne. Here, the author begins to sexually experiment with other boys, and comes to the realisation that he is gay. Several years later, on his first day at Xavier College (the Jesuit senior school), Conigrave sees John Caleo for the first time.

On the far side of the crush I noticed a boy. I saw the body of a man with an open, gentle face: such softness within that masculinity. He was beautiful, calm. I was transfixed. He wasn't talking, just listening to his friends with his hands in his pockets, smiling. What was it about his face?
He became aware that I was looking at him and greeted me with a lift of his eyebrows. I returned the gesture and then looked away, pretending something had caught my attention. But I kept sneaking looks. It's his eyelashes. They're unbelievable. [31]

The two form a friendship, and at the suggestion of Pepe, one of Tim's female friends, John is invited to a dinner party at Tim's house. The girls know Tim is in love with John, and 'pass a kiss' around the table for his benefit.

Juliet kissed Pepe. Their kiss lingered. Pepe came up for air. 'Tim'. As I kissed her she opened her mouth. Her tongue was exploring mine. I felt trapped. I was afraid to stop kissing her because I knew what was coming. I don't want John to think I'm enjoying this. Before I knew it my hand was on his knee, as if to let him know it was him I wanted. His hand settled on mine as Pepe continued kissing me. I couldn't shake the feeling that I was a virgin being led to the volcano to be sacrificed.
I turned to face him. He shut his eyes and pursed his lips. Everything went slow motion as I pressed my mouth against his. His gentle warm lips filled my head. My body dissolved and I was only lips pressed against the flesh of his. I would have stayed there for the rest of my life, but I was suddenly worried about freaking him out and I pulled away. I caught sight of his face - fresh, with chocolate-brown eyes, and a small, almost undetectable smile. [74]

A few weeks later, Tim rings John at home, and asks "John Caleo, will you go round with me?" The reply is an unambiguous "Yep".

The two graduate from high school in 1977, Tim attending Monash University and John studying to be a chiropractor at College. Despite parental opposition, Conigrave's eventual move to Sydney in order to attend NIDA, and youthful experimentation and infidelities, the relationship continues.

Tragically, when Tim and John finally move in together in Sydney and are genuinely happy, they are diagnosed with HIV. The year is 1985.

Until 1990, the men have relatively mild symptoms. Sadly, in the Autumn of 1991, John begins to rapidly deteriorate, suffering from lymphoma. Tim cares for his partner, whilst nursing symptoms of his own. The misery of HIV/AIDS is laid bare before the reader, with Conigrave sparing nothing in detailing the cruel progression of the disease. He watches as his lover's once-strong body is ravaged. The reader helplessly looks on as the story moves to its devastating conclusion.

At Christmas, in 1991, John is admitted to the Fairfield Hospital in Melbourne. A month later, on Australia Day 1992, he dies of an AIDS-related illness, with his lover by his side, gently stroking his hair. Nearly three years later, shortly after finishing Holding the Man, Tim Conigrave passes away in Sydney.

The final passages of the book are some of its most poignant:

I guess the hardest thing is having so much love for you and it somehow not being returned. I develop crushes all the time, but that is just misdirected need for you. You are a hole in my life, a black hole. Anything I place there cannot be returned. I miss you terribly. Ci vedremo lassu, angelo. [286].

Spanish and North American editions
The book was published in Spanish in 2002 under the title Amando En Tiempos De Silencio (Loving in the Days of Silence). .

The United States and Canadian edition of Holding the Man (with an afterword by Tommy Murphy) was released in September 2007 by Cuttyhunk Books, Boston, Massachusetts. (EAN/).

Adaptations

Holding the Man was adapted for the stage by Tommy Murphy in 2006. The original production, directed by David Berthold, is one of the most successful Australian stage productions in recent years, playing in most Australian capital cities and London's West End.

Murphy also wrote the script for the 2015 film adaptation, directed by Neil Armfield.

A feature-length documentary about Tim and John's relationship, called Remembering the Man, was released in 2015. The documentary had its world premiere on 18 October (the 21st anniversary of Conigrave's death) at the Adelaide Film Festival where it won the audience award for best documentary.

References

External links
Holding the baby with some photos of the real Tim Conigrave and John Caleo
AIDS, fragile love and dying, Steve Dow, 2003
Video interview with playwright Tommy Murphy

Australian autobiographies
1995 books - Holding the Man article]

HIV/AIDS in literature
Novels with gay themes
1990s LGBT literature